Küçükkızılca is a village in the Amasya District, Amasya Province of Turkey. Its population is 263 (2021).

References

Villages in Amasya District